The Crossroads Classic was a four-team college basketball tournament held annually at Gainbridge Fieldhouse in Indianapolis, Indiana, United States. It featured Indiana's four most accomplished men's NCAA Division I basketball schools each year - being the Butler Bulldogs, the Indiana Hoosiers, the Notre Dame Fighting Irish, and the Purdue Boilermakers. In odd numbered years, Notre Dame played Indiana while Butler played Purdue.  In even numbered years, Notre Dame played Purdue while Butler played Indiana.  Purdue and Indiana did not play each other in the Classic, as they are Big Ten conference rivals.

History
The event was the brainchild of former Purdue athletic director Morgan Burke.  It was designed to replicate a previous basketball event, the Hoosier Classic, which dated back to the 1940s. The Hoosier Classic was also a two-game non-conference showcase between Indiana, Purdue, Notre Dame and Butler.  The games were held at Butler's Hinkle Fieldhouse. 

In 2014, the athletic directors at the four participating schools announced that the Crossroads Classic had been renewed through 2021.

In 2016, for the first time in history, all four teams entered the Crossroads Classic ranked in the top 25.

Results by year

 * indicates the number of overtime periods.

All-time records by team

References

College men's basketball competitions in the United States
College basketball competitions
Butler Bulldogs men's basketball
Indiana Hoosiers men's basketball
Notre Dame Fighting Irish men's basketball
Purdue Boilermakers men's basketball
Sports competitions in Indianapolis
Recurring sporting events established in 2011
2011 establishments in Indiana